Penkridge is a civil parish in the district of South Staffordshire, Staffordshire, England.  It contains 76 listed buildings that are recorded in the National Heritage List for England.  Of these, one is listed at Grade I, the highest of the three grades, two are at Grade II*, the middle grade, and the others are at Grade II, the lowest grade.  The parish contains the town of Penkridge, smaller settlements including Bickford, Levedale,  Pillaton, and Whiston, and the surrounding countryside.  Most of the listed buildings are houses and associated structures, cottages, farmhouses, farm buildings, public houses, and shops, the earlier of which are timber framed or have a timber framed core.  The other listed buildings include a church, monuments and other structures in the churchyard, bridges, stocks and a bench, a former lock-up, a railway viaduct, a public library, and a mill.


Key

Buildings

References

Citations

Sources

Lists of listed buildings in Staffordshire
Listed